Rachida Dati (born 27 November 1965) is a French politician who served as Member of the European Parliament, representing Île-de-France. Prior to her election, she held the cabinet post of Keeper of the Seals, Minister of Justice. She was a spokesperson for Nicolas Sarkozy during the French presidential election of 2007. After his victory, Sarkozy appointed her to his Government on 18 May 2007. She was elected mayor of the 7th arrondissement of Paris on 29 March 2008.

Early life and education
Rachida Dati was born on 27 November 1965 in Saint-Rémy, Burgundy to a Moroccan father, a bricklayer named Mbarek, and an Algerian mother, named Fatima-Zohra. She was the second child of twelve in an impoverished family, and she spent her childhood in Chalon-sur-Saône in Burgundy.

Even though Dati was raised in a devout Islamic environment, she attended Catholic schools; Dati's own personal religious beliefs have been described as "unclear. She studied at the University of Burgundy, where she received a master's degree in Economics, and at Panthéon-Assas University, where she received a  Law degree.

Career

Early beginnings
At the age of sixteen, Dati started working as a paramedical assistant. She then worked for three years as an accountant at Elf Aquitaine while at university.

After meeting Jean-Luc Lagardère in 1990, Dati entered the audit management team of Matra Nortel communication. She later spent a year in London at the European Bank for Reconstruction and Development, in the records management and archiving department. In 1994, she was an auditing supervisor and secretary-general of the bureau of urban development studies at Suez (then Lyonnaise des Eaux). From 1995 to 1997, she worked as a technical advisor at the legal management division of the Ministry of Education.

In 1997, Dati was admitted to the École nationale de la magistrature, a public educational institution which offers courses necessary to become a magistrate. Upon leaving in 1999, she became a legal auditor at the Bobigny tribunal de grande instance (high court).

Career in politics
In 2002, Dati became Nicolas Sarkozy's advisor, working for him on an anti-delinquency project. In 2006, she joined the Union for a Popular Movement (UMP) party. On 14 January 2007, she was named spokesperson for Sarkozy on the day he was chosen as UMP candidate for the presidential elections of April 2007. After Sarkozy's victory on 6 May 2007, she was appointed Minister of Justice. Her rationalization of the court system was publicly opposed by judicial professionals. Later on, it was recognised by the French Court of Auditors as one of the most ambitious reforms of the judicial institution. When the Sarkozys' marriage began to break up, Dati frequently went on official presidential trips to accompany Nicolas Sarkozy.

On 23 January 2009, Sarkozy announced that Dati would take the second position on the UMP candidate list for Île-de-France constituency in the European Parliament election in June 2009, to which she was elected. She left her post as minister after being elected as a European deputy.

Career in the private sector
Soon after she left the government, in summer 2009, Dati switched to law, becoming a junior magistrate and assistant prosecutor. She also founded a consulting company called "La Bourdonnais consultant," which she had to dissolve at the beginning of 2010 to be able to resume the profession of lawyer, which she had to do by special dispensation (like other former magistrates). She sits on the editorial board of the French version of the Huffington Post, where she writes a weekly column about women's issues.

On the local level, Dati is the Mayor of the 7th district of Paris and Member of Paris City Council. On 9 February 2013, Dati announced she was a candidate for mayor of Paris in the 2014 local elections but she later withdrew because "the press has already chosen Nathalie Kosciusko-Morizet".

Member of the European Parliament, 2009–2019
A member of the European People's Party group in the European Parliament, Dati served on the Committee on Civil Liberties, Justice and Home Affairs and on the parliament's delegations for relations with the Mashreq countries, to the Parliamentary Assembly of the Union for the Mediterranean, and for relations with the Arab Peninsula.

In parliament, Dati was the Parliament's rapporteur on several texts dealing with countering terrorism and the prevention of radicalisation and recruitment of European citizens by terrorist organisations. Following the Charlie Hebdo shooting in 2015, she drafted a report into how to prevent the radicalisation of young Europeans. Her parliamentary work also included dealing with the prison systems and conditions in the European Union, and finding solutions to face the migration crisis with an EU common list of safe countries of origin.

In the UMP's 2012 leadership election, Dati endorsed Jean-François Copé.

In the Republicans’ 2017 leadership election, Dati endorsed Laurent Wauquiez. In early 2019, she announced her plan to run for the Paris municipal election in 2020.

Controversy
In early 2009, Dati received an anonymous death threat accompanied by a 9mm-calibre bullet.

Soon after Dati left the government in 2009 to stand for the European Parliament, she was hired by the Renault–Nissan–Mitsubishi Alliance as a legal adviser. In 2019, France's financial prosecutor launched an investigation into consulting fees she received from the alliance.

In December 2013, French media reported that Dati had received payments from French energy utility GDF-Suez. In early 2014, the President of the European Parliament Martin Schulz asked parliamentary services to look into conflict-of-interest concerns, but the inquiry was interrupted by the 2014 election campaign. At the same time, the French high authority for transparency in public life, France's anti-corruption watchdog, also opened a file on the case. In August 2021, Dati was charged by France's financial crime unit with passive corruption and benefiting from abuse of power. on 27 September 2021, Arte TV reported how caviar diplomacy led to the rejection of the Azerbaijani political prisoners report by the European Parliament in 2013. The rejection was due to bribed EU parliamentarians, and Dati also stood out as one of the leading voices to reject the truth about a flawed democracy in Azerbaijan. Her Italian colleague Luca Volontè has already been sentenced for accepting bribes. Volontè received 2.4 million euros as bribes from a 30 million bribe fund of the Azerbaijani fund to thwart EU guidelines by bribing its institutions.

Other activities
 PlaNet Finance, Member of International Advisory Board

Personal life
In September 2008, Dati announced that she was pregnant and would be a single mother. She revealed her pregnancy to a group of reporters who questioned her about mounting rumours. "I want to remain careful, because . . . I am still in the risky stage. I am 42", she was quoted as saying. Her daughter, Zohra, was born in early 2009.  As the name of the father was not revealed, many names circulated in gossip magazines.

However, in 2012, she started legal action against Dominique Desseigne, the chief executive of Groupe Lucien Barrière a casino market leader in France, Switzerland and Europe, to recognise paternity. In December 2012, a French court ordered Desseigne to undergo a paternity test to see if he fathered Dati's child. After Desseigne refused to undergo the test, a French court decision of 7 January 2016 ruled that Desseigne was indeed the father. In November 2016, she was listed as one of BBC's 100 Women.

Distinctions
 : Grand Officer of the Order of Ouissam Alaouite (April 2010)
  Two Sicilian Royal Family: Knight Grand Cross of the Royal Order of Francis I

References

External links

1965 births
Living people
People from Saint-Rémy, Saône-et-Loire
French Ministers of Justice
French people of Moroccan descent
French people of Algerian descent
MEPs for Île-de-France 2009–2014
MEPs for Île-de-France 2014–2019
21st-century women MEPs for France
Union for a Popular Movement MEPs
University of Burgundy alumni
French city councillors
Paris 2 Panthéon-Assas University alumni
The Republicans (France) MEPs
Women government ministers of France
Female justice ministers
BBC 100 Women
Mayors of arrondissements of Paris